Lithophane itata is a species of cutworm or dart moth in the family Noctuidae. It is found in North America.

The MONA or Hodges number for Lithophane itata is 9920.

References

Further reading

 
 
 

itata
Articles created by Qbugbot
Moths described in 1899